The point-tailed palmcreeper (Berlepschia rikeri) is a species of bird in the family Furnariidae, the ovenbirds. It is monotypic, the only member of the genus Berlepschia.

It is found in Bolivia, Brazil, Colombia, Ecuador, French Guiana, Guyana, Peru, Suriname, and Venezuela.
Its natural habitat is subtropical or tropical dry forest.

This is a deep chestnut-brown backed bird, with neck collar colorings of black and white flecking; the entire belly has the same black and white mottling. It has a medium to long, stout pointed bill.

The species is named for the two ornithologists-bird collectors who first described the species, Count Hans von Berlepsch and C. Riker.

References

External links
Point-tailed palmcreeper photo gallery VIREO Berlepschia+rikeri Photo-High Res

point-tailed palmcreeper
Birds of the Amazon Basin
Birds of the Guianas
Birds of Venezuela
Birds of the Ecuadorian Amazon
point-tailed palmcreeper
Birds of Brazil
Taxa named by Robert Ridgway
Taxonomy articles created by Polbot